Sturup Raceway is a motor racing circuit in Svedala, Sweden. It has been owned by the Danish Brask organisation since 2001. The circuit, by then called Sturupsbanan, opened in 1972 as a Rallycross venue. Later named Skånecrossbanan it was first asphalted to become a permanent road course in 1990.

Sturup held rounds of both the Swedish Touring Car Championship and Danish Touringcar Championship in 2008, but neither returned in 2009. The new Scandinavian Touring Car Championship returned to Sturup in 2012.

Lap records 

The official race lap records at the Sturup Raceway are listed as:

References

External links 
 
 Sturup Raceway at etracks

Motorsport venues in Sweden
Buildings and structures in Skåne County